In the United States, the Driver License Agreement (DLA) is an interstate compact written by the Joint Executive Board of the Driver License Compact (DLC) and the Non-Resident Violator Compact (NRVC) with staff support provided by the American Association of Motor Vehicle Administrators (AAMVA). The DLA requires all states to honor licenses issued by other member states, report traffic convictions to the licensing state, prohibit a member state from confiscating an out-of-state driver's license or jailing an out-of-state driver for a minor violation; and maintain a complete driver's history, including withdrawals and traffic convictions including those committed in non-DLA states. 

When a DLA member state receives a report concerning its drivers from a non-DLA member state, the member state will be required to treat the report the same as if it came from a member state. As with the previous compacts, the DLA requires a state to post all out-of-state traffic convictions to the driver's record, and a state must apply its own laws to all out-of-state convictions. As with the previous compacts, the DLA allows other jurisdictions to access motor vehicle records, in accordance with the Drivers' Privacy Protection Act (DPPA), and to transfer the driver's history if the driver transfers his license. 
 
The DLA has some changes from the NRVC. Unlike the NRVC, under the DLA, adverse action can be taken against a driver for not responding to violations such as equipment violations, registration violations, parking violations, and weight limit violations. Other changes from the NRVC are that in order for a driver to keep his license under the NRVC, he just had to respond to the citation by paying the fine. With the DLA, the driver must comply with any order from the out of state court. An example would be a driver from Arizona getting cited for tinted windows while traveling through Virginia, even though the tinted windows are legal back at home. The driver is ordered to fix the tint to meet Virginia law even though the driver left Virginia. Under the NRVC, to retain said license, the driver just pays the fine but with DLA, the driver must do what the court says including paying a fine, but also fixing vehicle equipment, and/or community service.

History

Work on the Driver License Agreement started in 1994/1995 by the Driver License Compact and the Non-Resident Violator Compact Joint Executive Board with the idea to combine and improve the compacts and make them enforceable, possibly with federal grant funding. Around the same time, Congress passed the North American Free Trade Agreement (NAFTA) and the Joint Executive Board decided jurisdictions in Mexico and Canada could join. 

The federal government through appropriations in Congress funded the Joint Executive Board in writing the new Driver License Agreement. In 2000, the agreement was ratified by the U.S. states with two votes against. After the September 11 attacks in 2001, the Joint Executive Board strengthened driver license security provisions in the DLA, and the revised DLA was again ratified by the U.S. states with some votes against. The information on who voted against the DLA is considered confidential and proprietary information by the AAMVA.

Connecticut was the first state to join in January 2002.

States that are members
 Connecticut
 Arkansas – can join under administrative rulemakeing under Act 446 as passed by the 2005 Legislative Session
 Massachusetts

Notes
 The Driver License Agreement document (PDF)
 Real ID Act of 2005

Legislation and other
 Legislation in the past has been sponsored in Kentucky, Michigan, Minnesota, and North Carolina to join
 There has been legislation in the past, introduced in the US Congress, to mandate that states must participate.  Such legislation included HR10 - 9/11 Implementation Act of 2004  and HR418 - The Real ID Act of 2005  but the mandate has not made it into the final bills.
 Driver's Privacy Protection Act

References
American Association of Motor Vehicle Administrators (AAMVA)

United States interstate compacts
Traffic law